Vladimir Ivanovich Belkov (26 December 1941 – 9 February 2022) was a Russian professional football coach and player.

Belkov played in the Soviet First League with FC Tekstilshchik Ivanovo. He died on 9 February 2022, at the age of 80.

References

External links
 Profile at Footballfacts.ru

1941 births
2022 deaths
People from Vichuga
Sportspeople from Ivanovo Oblast
Soviet footballers
Association football midfielders
FC Tekstilshchik Ivanovo players
Soviet football managers
Russian football managers